Blust is a surname. Notable people with the surname include:

 Christina Blust, musician
 John Blust (born 1954), American politician
 Robert Blust (1940–2022), American linguist